Monique H. Koeyers-Felida (23 April 1967 – 15 August 2016) was a Curaçaoan politician of the Movement for the Future of Curaçao. She was a member of the Estates of Curaçao between 2010 and 2015. She was focused on matters related to education, culture, and sports.

In the 2012 elections Koeyers-Felida obtained 332 votes and was reelected. Suffering from cancer she resigned from the Estates in November 2015 and was replaced by Sithree van Heydoorn.

Before her time in office Koeyers-Felida worked as a teacher and a television presenter.

References

1967 births
2016 deaths
Curaçao women in politics
Members of the Estates of Curaçao
Movement for the Future of Curaçao politicians
21st-century Dutch women politicians
21st-century Dutch politicians
Curaçao journalists
Curaçao women journalists